L'Épave (shipwreck) may refer to:

Books
Les Épaves (The Wrecks), six poems by Charles Baudelaire printed in Brussels, 1866 
L'Épave, story by Guy de Maupassant

Film
 L'Épave, film by Gérard Bourgeois 1908
 L'Épave (fr), film by Louis Feuillade  1909 
 L'Épave, film by Maurice Mariaud  1917 
 L'Épave, film by  :fr:Lucien Lehmann  1920 
 L'Épave (fr), film by Willy Rozier 1949 with Françoise Arnoul 
Épaves, 1943 documentary by Jacques Cousteau